Abdullah Al-Khateeb (born 11 March 1995) is a Saudi Arabian professional footballer who plays as a defender for Pro League side Al-Ettifaq.

Career
Al-Khateeb began his career at the youth teams of Al-Ahli. On 24 July 2017, Al-Khateeb joined MS League side Al-Khaleej on loan for the 2017–18 season. On 17 August 2018, Al-Khateeb's loan to Al-Khaleej was renewed for the 2018–19 season. On 21 August 2019, Al-Khateeb signed a three-year contract with Al-Ettifaq. On 30 April 2021, Al-Khateeb renewed his contract with Al-Ettifaq until the end of the 2025–26 season.

Career statistics

Club

References

External links 
 

1995 births
Living people
Sportspeople from Jeddah
Saudi Arabian footballers
Saudi Arabia youth international footballers
Al-Ahli Saudi FC players
Khaleej FC players
Ettifaq FC players
Saudi Professional League players
Saudi First Division League players
Association football defenders